La Marseillaise is a French film of 1938, directed by Jean Renoir. A vast political, social, and military panorama of the French Revolution up to the autumn of 1792, its many episodes range from the life of ordinary working people through the committed bourgeois struggling for change up to those in the upper echelons of society defending the status quo.

Plot
Centred on characters from the rebellious city of Marseille, most of the great events of the Revolution from 1789 to 1792 occur offstage. In Marseille, citizens capture the royal fortress of Fort Saint-Jean and set up a revolutionary council. When war is declared against Austria in April 1792, the city raises a force of 500 volunteers who march to Paris. Entertained there to a banquet, a man from Alsace sings a patriotic ballad which moves the men from Marseille. Adopting it as their marching song, it is soon known as La Marseillaise. In July Prussia joins forces with Austria and the people, enraged by the threats in the Brunswick Manifesto, storm the Tuileries Palace, making prisoners of the King and Queen. A volunteer army then marches east to face the highly professional Prussian forces and in September, to the astonishment of the world, beats them at Valmy.

Fictional characters and happenings are mixed in with historical characters and actual events. While careful to show genuine revolutionaries who wanted constitutional change rather than mob violence or anarchy, as well as privileged people who accepted the need for ordered change, Renoir often uses members of the public to express the ferment of ideas that gripped France.

Reception
La Marseillaise, while not one of Renoir's better-known films, has received positive reviews from today's critics.

Cast
 Pierre Renoir  as King Louis XVI
 Lise Delamare as Queen Marie-Antoinette
 Germaine Lefebvre as Madame Élisabeth, the King's sister
 Louis Jouvet as Pierre Louis Roederer
 Georges Spanelly as La Chesnaye, commander of the Palace guard
 Léon Larive as Picard, the King's valet
 Elisa Ruis as the Princesse de Lamballe
 William Aguet as de La Rochefoucauld

References

External links
 

1938 films
1930s historical drama films
French historical drama films
1930s French-language films
French Revolution films
French black-and-white films
Films directed by Jean Renoir
Films set in the 1780s
Films set in 1792
French films based on actual events
Cultural depictions of Louis XVI
Cultural depictions of Marie Antoinette
1938 drama films
Films scored by Joseph Kosma
1930s French films
La Marseillaise